The following highways are numbered 376:

Canada
 Nova Scotia Route 376
Saskatchewan Highway 376

Japan
 Japan National Route 376

United States
  Interstate 376
  Interstate 376 Business Loop
  Florida State Road 376 (former)
  Georgia State Route 376
  Iowa Highway 376 (unsigned designation for US 75 Bus.)
  Maryland Route 376
  Missouri Route 376
  Montana Secondary Highway 376 (former)
  Nevada State Route 376
  New York State Route 376
  Ohio State Route 376
  Puerto Rico Highway 376
  Virginia State Route 376
  Wyoming Highway 376